Sabine Lepsius (15 January 1864 – 22 November 1942) was a German portrait painter.

Life 
She was born in Berlin as the daughter of portrait painter Gustav Graef and Franziska Liebreich (1824–1893), a lithographer. She studied with her father and, in 1892, married the painter Reinhold Lepsius. She and her husband were held in equal regard and were very popular with the business community and the wealthy. Her brother was the art historian Botho Graef.

She was also a close friend and follower of Stefan George. Her son Stefan (1897–1917), who was killed in World War I, was named after him. In 1935 she published a book about their friendship in which she attributed her brother Botho's fatal heart attack to the news of her son's death.

Lepsius exhibited her work at the Woman's Building at the 1893 World's Columbian Exposition in Chicago, Illinois.

Her salon in Berlin-Westend was considered a major social gathering point. Georg Simmel, Wilhelm Dilthey, August Endell and Rainer Maria Rilke were among those who attended. She was one of the founding members of the Berlin Secession and exhibited with them until 1913.

Most of her approximately 280 portraits were of people in the Jewish community and were lost or destroyed during World War II.

Lepsius died in 1942 in Bayreuth.

Writings 
 Vom deutschen Lebensstil; Leipzig: Seemann & Co. 1916
 Stefan George : Geschichte einer Freundschaft. Berlin: Verlag Die Runde 1935
 Ein Berliner Künstlerleben um die Jahrhundertwende :Erinnerungen; Munich: G. Müller 1972

See also
 List of German women artists

References

Further reading 
 Irmgard Wirth: Berliner Malerei im 19. Jahrhundert; Siedler Verlag, Berlin 1990, pg.349.
 Ruth Glatzer: Das Wilhelminische Berlin; Siedler Verlag, Berlin 1997, pg.192.
 Annette Dorgerloh: Das Künstlerehepaar Lepsius. Zur Berliner Porträtmalerei um 1900. Akademie Verlag, Berlin 2003,  (Digitalized by Google Books)
 Annette Dogerloh: Sabine Lepsius. In: Britta Jürgs: Denn da ist nichts mehr, wie es die Natur gewollt. Portraits von Künstlerinnen und Schriftstellerinnen um 1900. AvivA Verlag, Berlin, 2001, ; pgs.216-232

External links 

 

1864 births
1942 deaths
19th-century German painters
20th-century German painters
20th-century German women artists
19th-century German women artists
Artists from Berlin
German salon-holders
German women painters
Académie Julian alumni